Sir Kenneth Clinton Wheare, CMG (26 March 1907 – 7 September 1979) was an Australian academic, who spent most of his career at Oxford University in England. He was an expert on the constitutions of the British Commonwealth. He advised constitutional assemblies in former British colonies.

Early life and family
Wheare was educated at Scotch College, Melbourne and was later a student at Oriel College, Oxford, gaining a first class degree in Philosophy, Politics and Economics and also undertaking postgraduate study. He met his wife Joan (1915–2013) when he was her tutor. One of their sons is Tom Wheare.

Career
In 1944, Kenneth Wheare was appointed Gladstone Professor of Government at All Souls College. He was Chairman of the Departmental Committee on Children and the Cinema from 1947 to 1950 and chaired a committee to examine film censorship in the United Kingdom. The Wheare committee's findings published in 1950 led to the introduction of a compulsory certificate, X (Explicit Content), allowing only those aged 16 and older to enter. Another outcome of the Wheare report was the creation of the Children's Film Foundation.

In 1956, he became Rector of Exeter College, Oxford. A gargoyle of his likeness is carved on the Bodleian Library, visible from the Exeter College Fellows' Garden.

Wheare was Chairman of the Rhodes Trust (1962–69), President of the British Academy (1967–71), Chancellor of the University of Liverpool from 1972. He was also a Vice-Chancellor of the University of Oxford from 1964 to 1966.

Honours
Kenneth Wheare was appointed Companion of the Order of St Michael and St George (CMG) in 1953 and was knighted in 1966. He gave the British Academy's 1974 Master-Mind Lecture.

In 2017, Oxford Brookes University named a newly rebuilt lecture hall after Wheare.

References

1907 births
1979 deaths
People educated at Scotch College, Melbourne
Alumni of Oriel College, Oxford
Australian Rhodes Scholars
20th-century Australian historians
Rectors of Exeter College, Oxford
Vice-Chancellors of the University of Oxford
People associated with the University of Liverpool
Knights Bachelor
Fellows of the British Academy
Presidents of the British Academy
Gladstone Professors of Government
Fellows of All Souls College, Oxford
Australian political scientists
Scholars of constitutional law
20th-century political scientists